The Mitsubishi Pajero iO is a mini SUV produced by the Japanese manufacturer Mitsubishi between 1999 (since June 15, 1998, in three-door form, and August 24, 1998, as a five-door) and 2007. The "iO" name is derived from the Italian for "I" which, according to Mitsubishi, "generates an image of being easy to get to know, easy to drive, and of being one's very own Pajero".

Overview
It was exported as the Montero iO, and to Europe as the Pajero Pinin, Shogun Pinin or simply Pinin to honour Pininfarina, which built the local market versions of the car at their factory near Turin, Italy. It was also produced in Brazil as the Pajero TR4 from 2002 to 2015 under license. The name was changed after imported versions were referred to as "1.0" instead of "iO", which could lead to confusion about the engine sizes. The Brazilian TR4 was Mitsubishi's first four-wheel drive flexible-fuel vehicle - running on gasoline, ethanol or a combination of the two - when it was introduced in July 2007. The car is also produced in China by Changfeng Automobile under the Liebao (Leopaard) brand as the Changfeng Liebao Feiteng CFA 6400.

Annual production

(sources: Facts & Figures 2000, Facts & Figures 2005, Facts & Figures 2008, Mitsubishi Motors website)

References

Pajero IO
Cars introduced in 1998
2000s cars
2010s cars
Mini sport utility vehicles
Rear-wheel-drive vehicles
All-wheel-drive vehicles